The 2002 Cal Poly Mustangs football team represented California Polytechnic State University during the 2002 NCAA Division I-AA football season.

Cal Poly competed as an NCAA Division I-AA independent in 2002. The Mustangs were led by second-year head coach Rich Ellerson and played home games at Mustang Stadium in San Luis Obispo, California. The Mustangs finished the season with a record of three wins and eight losses (3–8). Overall, the team was outscored by its opponents 247–302 for the season.

Schedule

Notes

References

Cal Poly
Cal Poly Mustangs football seasons
Cal Poly Mustangs football